Francesco Peverelli (1789 – 1854) was an Italian architect, active in Lombardy in a Neoclassical style.

He was a pupil of Luigi Cagnola, and helped complete, with Francesco Londonio the Younger, the Arco della Pace in Milan, after Cagnola's death in 1833. He also completed Cagnola's eclectic house:  Villa La Rotonda.

References

1789 births
1854 deaths
Architects from Milan
19th-century Italian architects